Uryupino is a rural locality (a selo) and the administrative center of Uryupinsky Selsoviet, Aleysky District, Altai Krai, Russia. The population was 628 as of 2013. There are 13 streets.

Geography 
Uryupino is located 18 km southwest of Aleysk (the district's administrative centre) by road. Malakhovo is the nearest rural locality.

References 

Rural localities in Aleysky District